Charles Douglas Cox (born 8 October 1957) is a Canadian wrestler. He competed at the 1988 Summer Olympics and the 1996 Summer Olympics.

References

1957 births
Living people
Canadian male sport wrestlers
Olympic wrestlers of Canada
Wrestlers at the 1988 Summer Olympics
Wrestlers at the 1996 Summer Olympics
Sportspeople from Guelph
Commonwealth Games medallists in wrestling
Commonwealth Games silver medallists for Canada
Pan American Games medalists in wrestling
Pan American Games gold medalists for Canada
Pan American Games bronze medalists for Canada
Wrestlers at the 1987 Pan American Games
Medalists at the 1987 Pan American Games
Wrestlers at the 1986 Commonwealth Games
Medallists at the 1986 Commonwealth Games